Dell is a census-designated place in Beaverhead County, Montana, United States. The settlement is located in a valley beside the Red Rock River.

History
Dell was founded as a station stop on the newly completed Utah and Northern Railway, which reached Butte in 1881. It became a trading center for ranchers.

Dell School opened in 1903, and was later converted to a restaurant. In 1907, the Dell Telephone Company was founded to construct and maintain a telephone system to Sheep Creek Basin.

Geography
Dell is noted for having the lightest precipitation in Montana.

Climate
According to the Köppen Climate Classification system, Dell has a semi-arid climate, abbreviated "BSk" on climate maps.

Demographics

The population was 17 at the 2020 United States census.

Infrastructure
Dell Flight Strip is located northwest of Dell.  Dell has a post office.

See also

 List of census-designated places in Montana

References

Unincorporated communities in Beaverhead County, Montana
Unincorporated communities in Montana